Trelles is the surname of:

 Augusto Barcía Trelles (1881–1961), Spanish politician, briefly acting Prime Minister of Spain
 Efraín Trelles (1953–2018), Peruvian historian, writer, journalist and sports commentator
 Gustavo Trelles (born 1955), Uruguayan former rally driver
 Ignacio Trelles (1916–2020), Mexican football player and coach
 Norbert Trelle (born 1942), German Roman Catholic bishop
 Rafael Trelles (born 1957), Puerto Rican artist

See also
 José Alonso y Trelles (1857–1924), Uruguayan poet